Big Love is the debut solo album by English singer Ali Campbell, lead singer of the band UB40. It was released in 1995 and includes the singles "That Look in Your Eye", which reached number 5 in the UK Singles Chart, "Let Your Yeah Be Yeah", which reached number 25 and "Somethin' Stupid", a duet with Campbell's daughter Kibibi, which reached number 30.

Track listing

Charts

Certifications

References

External links
Big Love at Discogs

1995 debut albums
Virgin Records albums